Giuseppe "Peppe" Gibilisco (born 5 January 1979) is an Italian coach and former pole vaulter, who won the 2003 World Championships with a personal best of 5.90 m. He followed this with a bronze medal in the 2004 Olympics. He also competed in four-man bobsleigh in two race of the 2016–17 Bobsleigh World Cup finishing 25th and 28th.

He is the coach of the Italian pole vaulter Claudio Stecchi.

Biography
Giuseppe Gibilisco was born in Syracuse, Sicily. He won twelve medals (ten of these at senior level), at the International athletics competitions. He has 28 caps in national team from 1998 to 2011. He participated in three Olympic Games and four world championships. In 2007, Gibilisco was suspended by the FIDAL (Italian Athletics Federation) with a two-year ban, due to his involvement in the "Oil for Drugs" case and his relation with suspect doctor Carlo Santuccione, although he had never tested positive, but two months after the Board of Appeals reverses the ruling and decide for acquittal.

In 2011, he could obtain 5.70 m, minimum qualification to the IAAF World Championships in Daegu, South Korea, but the IAAF did not approve because the result was obtained in an esibition event in a streets in Landau, Germany. In 2012 he jumped 5:52 m in Liévin, France indoor and, as a result of an injury, not disputing the outdoor season thus losing the possibility to participate in his fourth Olympics.

On 23 July 2013 he jumped 24 time 5.70 m outdoor, in Italy three other athletes were capable of doing so on six occasions: Fabio Pizzolato (only one jump at 5.75 m), Mauro Maurilio Mariani (three times 5.70 m) and Gianni Iapichino, former Fiona May husband (two times 5.70 m). In the indoor seasons he jumped other six times at least 5.70 m, one time in 2003 and 2010, and 4 times in 2004.

Gibilisco retired from pole vaulting in August 2014.

Since 2016, Gibilisco has represented Italy at international bobsleigh competitions. On 29 January 2017 he made his Bobsleigh World Cup debut at Königssee as a brakeman for the four-man team of veteran pilot Simone Bertazzo, finishing in 25th place.

National records
 Pole vault: 5.90 m ( Paris, 28 August 2003) - current holder
 Pole vault indoor: 5.82 m ( Donetsk, 15 February 2004) - current holder

Progression

Outdoor
He finished the season 9 times in world top 25 (5 outdoor, 4 indoor), in 2003 and 2004 he finished in fourth place outdoor, in 2004 he finished 2nd indoor.

Indoor

Achievements

National titles
He has won 3 times the individual national championship.
3 wins in the pole vault indoor (2001, 2002, 2004)

See also
 List of Italian records in athletics
 List of Italian records in masters athletics
 Italian all-time lists - Pole vault

References

External links
 
 Giuseppe Gibilisco at Fiamme Gialle web site

1979 births
Living people
Italian male pole vaulters
Olympic athletes of Italy
Athletes (track and field) at the 2000 Summer Olympics
Athletes (track and field) at the 2004 Summer Olympics
Athletes (track and field) at the 2008 Summer Olympics
People from Syracuse, Sicily
Olympic bronze medalists for Italy
World Athletics Championships athletes for Italy
World Athletics Championships medalists
Athletics competitors of Fiamme Gialle
Medalists at the 2004 Summer Olympics
Olympic bronze medalists in athletics (track and field)
Mediterranean Games gold medalists for Italy
Mediterranean Games silver medalists for Italy
Athletes (track and field) at the 2001 Mediterranean Games
Athletes (track and field) at the 2013 Mediterranean Games
Mediterranean Games medalists in athletics
World Athletics Championships winners
Italian male bobsledders
Italian athletics coaches
Italian Athletics Championships winners
Sportspeople from the Province of Syracuse